Marianne Humeniuk (14 October 1947 – 19 November 2014) was a Canadian swimmer. She competed in the women's 100 metre butterfly at the 1964 Summer Olympics.

References

1947 births
2014 deaths
Canadian female swimmers
Olympic swimmers of Canada
Swimmers at the 1964 Summer Olympics
Place of birth missing
Canadian female butterfly swimmers
20th-century Canadian women